Charlotte Snyder Turgeon (21 June 1912 – 22 September 2009) was an American chef and author. She translated and edited the first English-language version of the Larousse Gastronomique.

Turgeon was a graduate of Smith College and classmate of fellow French chef Julia Child.

Her notable works include:
Creative International Cookbook 
Creative Cooking Course 
The Encyclopedia of Creative Cooking 
The Tante Marie's Cooking School Cookbook

References

1912 births
2009 deaths
American food writers